Angelo Anthony Buono Jr. (October 5, 1934 – September 21, 2002) was an American serial killer, kidnapper and rapist who, together with his adopted cousin Kenneth Bianchi, were known as the Hillside Stranglers. Buono and Bianchi were convicted of killing ten young women in Los Angeles, California, between October 1977 and February 1978.

Early life
Angelo Buono was born on October 5, 1934, in Rochester, New York, to first-generation Italian emigrants from San Buono. Buono had developed an extensive criminal history, ranging from failure to pay child support, grand theft auto, assault and rape. In 1975, when Buono was 41 years old, he came into contact with his adopted cousin, Kenneth Bianchi. A self-described "ladies man", Buono persuaded Bianchi to join him in pimping out two women he had been holding as virtual prisoners.

Murders
In October 1977, Buono and Bianchi began killing women. Cruising around Los Angeles, California, in Buono's car and using fake badges, the two men persuaded their victims that they were undercover police officers. They would then order the victims into Bianchi's Cadillac, which they claimed was an unmarked police car, and drive to Buono's home to torture and murder them. The women and girls ranged in age from 12 to 28. The victims were:

 Yolanda Washington, age 19 – October 17, 1977
 Judith Lynn Miller, age 15 – October 31, 1977
 Lissa Kastin, age 21 – November 5, 1977
 Jane King, age 28 – November 9, 1977
 Dolores Cepeda, age 12 – November 13, 1977
 Sonja Johnson, age 14 – November 13, 1977
 Kristina Weckler, age 20 – November 20, 1977
 Lauren Wagner, age 18 – November 28, 1977
 Kimberely Martin, age 17 – December 9, 1977
 Cindy Lee Hudspeth, age 20 – February 16, 1978

Both Buono and Bianchi would sexually abuse their victims before strangling them. They experimented with other methods of killing, such as lethal injection, electric shock, and carbon monoxide poisoning. Even while committing the murders, Bianchi applied for a job with the Los Angeles Police Department (LAPD) and had even been taken for several rides with police officers while they were searching for the Hillside Strangler (who until Buono and Bianchi's capture was assumed to be a lone individual). 

Shortly after they botched their would-be eleventh murder, Bianchi revealed to Buono he had participated in LAPD police ride-alongs and that he was currently being questioned about the Hillside Strangler case. Buono flew into a rage and threatened to kill Bianchi if he did not move to Bellingham, Washington. In May 1978, Bianchi moved to Bellingham.

Trial
The legal case against Buono was based largely upon Bianchi's testimony. Deciding that Bianchi was an unreliable and uncooperative witness, the case's original prosecutors from District Attorney John Van de Kamp's office moved to dismiss all charges against Buono and set him free. The presiding judge, Ronald M. George, refused to release Buono and reassigned the case to California Attorney General George Deukmejian's office. 

Buono's trial would become the longest in American legal history, lasting from November 1981 until November 1983. During the trial, Bianchi, in exchange for a lighter sentence, testified against Buono. The jury convicted Buono on nine counts of murder and sentenced him to life imprisonment, with Judge George commenting that he felt a death sentence would have been the appropriate punishment.

Bianchi was ultimately sentenced to life in prison with the possibility of parole.

Prison sentence, death and aftermath
In 1986, Buono married Christine Kizuka, a mother of three and a supervisor at the California State Employment Development Department. He died of a heart attack in September 2002 while incarcerated at Calipatria State Prison. His body was cremated.

In 2007, Buono's grandson, Christopher Buono, committed suicide shortly after shooting his grandmother, Mary Castillo, in the head. Castillo was at one time married to Buono, and had five children with him, including Chris' father. Chris Buono was unaware of his grandfather's true identity until 2005.

Media
In the 1989 film The Case of the Hillside Stranglers, Buono was portrayed by actor Dennis Farina. In the 2004 film The Hillside Strangler, Buono was portrayed by actor Nicholas Turturro and in Rampage: The Hillside Strangler Murders (2006), he was played by Tomas Arana.

See also 
 List of serial killers in the United States
 List of serial killers by number of victims

References

External links
Crime Library's story on the Hillside Stranglers

1934 births
1977 murders in the United States
2002 deaths
20th-century American criminals
American male criminals
American murderers of children
American people convicted of assault
American people convicted of murder
American people convicted of rape
American people convicted of theft
American people of Italian descent
American people who died in prison custody
American pimps
American prisoners sentenced to life imprisonment
American rapists
American serial killers
Crime in California
Criminals from California
Criminals from Los Angeles
Criminals from New York (state)
Male serial killers
People convicted of murder by California
People from Rochester, New York
Prisoners sentenced to life imprisonment by California
Prisoners who died in California detention
Serial killers who died in prison custody
Violence against women in the United States